CIS was a rugby union side that played matches in 1992. The side consisted of members of the Commonwealth of Independent States and was the successor team of the Soviet Union. The team played two matches, losing both fixtures. One match was played in Moscow, with the other was played in Seville.

Results

See also
 USSR national rugby union team

References
 

International rugby union teams
Multinational rugby union teams
Former national rugby union teams
Sport in the Commonwealth of Independent States
Rugby union in Russia